The National Emerging Infectious Diseases Laboratories, or NEIDL, is a biosciences facility of Boston University located near Boston Medical Center on Albany Street in the South End neighborhood of Boston, Massachusetts.

The lab is part of a national network of secure facilities that study infectious diseases, whether naturally occurring or introduced through bioterrorism. The Labs include a BSL-4 laboratory, which study the most dangerous and deadly human diseases.

The current director of NEIDL is microbiology researcher Dr. Ronald Corley, also Chair of Microbiology at Boston University.

History
On February 2, 2006, Boston Medical Center received regulatory approval from the federal government to fund construction of a biosafety laboratory on its medical campus in the South End, Boston.

There has been strong community opposition to the planned building, and BSL-2 level research did not begin until 2012 due to court injunctions.

In early 2014, BSL-4 research was still being opposed by community groups including the Union Park Neighborhood Association and Boston City Councilor Charles Yancey who was conducting hearings on its safety and recommending a citywide ban on BSL-4 research.

The NEIDL was given final approval for BSL-4 research by the Boston Public Health Commission on December 6, 2017, with the support of Boston Mayor Marty Walsh. Every project at the lab will also need individual BPHC review and approval.

In the wake of the COVID-19 pandemic, NEIDL's BSL-4 research on ebola was paused to allow for experiments on the COVID-19 infectious disease.

See also 
 Galveston National Laboratory (GNL)
 National Institute of Allergy and Infectious Diseases (NIAID)

References

External links 
 Boston University National Emerging Infectious Diseases Laboratories

Laboratories in the United States
Infectious disease organizations
Biosafety level 4 laboratories
Skyscrapers in Boston
Biological research institutes in the United States
Medical research institutes in Massachusetts
Microbiology institutes